The Embassy of the Republic of Cameroon in Beijing is the diplomatic mission of Cameroon in the People's Republic of China. It is located at No.7 Dong Wu Jie, San Li Tun in Chaoyang District of Beijing.

The current ambassador is H.E. Mr. Martin Mpana who replaced H.E. Mr. Eleih-Elle Etian since 2008.

Services
The Embassy has the authority of issuing new and renewing old passports to Cameroonian Citizen. The procedure usually takes a few months.
Visa to non-Cameroonian citizen can also be applied for at the Embassy and the procedure would take a few days (up to a couple of weeks)
All fees can be paid in RMB.

Personnel
H.E. Mr. Martin Mpana, Ambassador Extraordinary and Plenipotentiary
Mr. Nsah V. Paul Gerard, Minister Counsellor
Mr. Haman Yaya, First Secretary
Mr. Mouandjo Mouandjo, Second Secretary
Navy Captain Betangane, Defence Attaché
Lieutenant-Colonel Avom Nang Jean Jacques, Deputy Defence Attaché
Major Mvondo James, Army Attaché
Major Ibamie Ousmana, Air Attaché
Captain Etoua Julien, Gendarmerie Attaché
Mr Souleymanou, Chief of the Cameroon Tourism Bureau for Asia

History

See also
List of diplomatic missions of Cameroon
Foreign relations of Cameroon

References

External links
TravelChinaGuide*
Diplomatie : Des retraités à la tête des ambassades(French)*
ForeignerCN.com

Beijing
Cameroon
Cameroon–China relations